Edo Terglav (born January 24, 1980) is a Slovenian former professional ice hockey right winger.  He was drafted 249th overall by the Buffalo Sabres in the 1998 NHL Entry Draft, the first Slovenian selected in an NHL Entry Draft.

He currently works as an assistant coach and youth hockey supervisor for Diables Rouges de Briançon of the Ligue Magnus in France.

Career statistics

References

External links

1980 births
Baie-Comeau Drakkar players
Buffalo Sabres draft picks
Detroit Vipers players
Diables Rouges de Briançon players
HDD Olimpija Ljubljana players
Johnstown Chiefs players
Living people
Montreal Rocket players
New Mexico Scorpions (CHL) players
Slovenia men's national ice hockey team coaches
Slovenian ice hockey right wingers
Sportspeople from Kranj
Slovenian ice hockey coaches
Slovenian expatriate ice hockey people
Slovenian expatriate sportspeople in the United States
Slovenian expatriate sportspeople in Canada
Slovenian expatriate sportspeople in France
Expatriate ice hockey players in France
Expatriate ice hockey players in the United States
Expatriate ice hockey players in Canada